In enzymology, an aromatic-amino-acid transaminase is an enzyme that catalyzes the chemical reaction

an aromatic amino acid + 2-oxoglutarate  an aromatic oxo acid + L-glutamate

Thus, the two substrates of this enzyme are aromatic amino acid and 2-oxoglutarate, whereas its two products are aromatic oxo acid and L-glutamate.

This enzyme belongs to the family of transferases, specifically the transaminases, which transfer nitrogenous groups.  The systematic name of this enzyme class is aromatic-amino-acid:2-oxoglutarate aminotransferase. Other names in common use include aromatic amino acid aminotransferase, aromatic aminotransferase, and ArAT.  This enzyme participates in 6 metabolic pathways: methionine metabolism, tyrosine metabolism, phenylalanine metabolism, phenylalanine, tyrosine and tryptophan biosynthesis, novobiocin biosynthesis, and alkaloid biosynthesis i.  It employs one cofactor, pyridoxal phosphate.

Structural studies

References

 

EC 2.6.1
Pyridoxal phosphate enzymes
Enzymes of known structure